Pavadairayan is a Dravidian folk and Hindu deity worshipped in rural Tamil Nadu. He is considered to be a kaval deivam, and best recognised for serving as a general for the deity Aiyanar.

Legend 

The deity is associated with the myth of the Mayana Kollai, where he accompanies Angala Parameshvari, an aspect of Parvati, to slay a demon that lurked in a cremation ground.

Pavadairayan is also often described to be a sea god who is venerated by adherents along with their adherence to mainstream Shaivism.

Iconography 
As a kaval deivam deity, the deity is usually placed outside the sannadhi of the central deity. Pavadairayan is unique in the fact that he is the only entity who has been portrayed sitting on the lap of Angala Parameshvari.

Worship 
As a village deity, Pavadairayan is worshipped mostly through stones and trees. In several Angala Parameswari's temples, Pavadairayan has a separate sannidhi. There are only a few temples dedicated to Pavadairayan.

According to local tradition, the place where Pavadairayan lived was called Rayampuram before being renamed Royapuram. The place where Pavadairayan served as a protector for Kali is Royapuram, at the Kalmandapam Angalaparameswari Amman Temple.

See also
 Village deities of Tamil Nadu
 Angala Parameshvari
 Aiyanar

References

External links
 கிராம தெய்வங்கள் / Village deities பாவாடை ராயன் 
 பருதேசியப்பருக்கு பால் காவடி!
 Goddess Angalaparameswari Amman history
 போகர் 7000 சப்த காண்டம் 5615 ஆம் பாடல்.
 நடுகல் கூறும் தமிழரின் வாழ்வு நெறிகள்
 Rayanpuram became Royapuram.
Pavadairayan Statue at YALE PEABODY MUSEUM OF NATURAL HISTORY, USA!

Tamil deities
Regional Hindu gods